Leon Madsen (born 5 September 1988) is a Danish speedway rider who is twice a World Championship silver medalist.

Career
Born in Vejle, Madsen won the 80cc junior World Championship in 2001. In 2018 and 2022, Madsen won the Individual Speedway European Championship. In 2019 and 2022 he was the silver medalist in the Speedway World Championship, on both occasions he finished runner-up behind Bartosz Zmarzlik.

Major results

World individual Championships 
2019 World individual championship - runner up
2019 World individual championship - 5th
2021 World individual championship - 7th
2022 World individual championship - runner up

World team Championships 
2019 Speedway of Nations - 4th
2020 Speedway of Nations - 3rd
2021 Speedway of Nations - 3rd
2022 Speedway of Nations - 4th

Grand Prix wins
Warsaw Grand Prix Champion
British Grand Prix Champion
Torun Grand Prix Champion

European Championships 
 Individual European Championship
 2007 - 13th
 2018 - Winner
 2019 - 3rd 2020 - 2nd 2021 - 2nd 2022 - Winner

Junior World Championships
 Individual U-21 World Championship (Under-21 World Championship)
 2008 - 7th placed in the Qualifying Round Four
 2009 - 9th placed in the Qualifying Round Five
 Team U-21 World Championship (Under-21 Speedway World Cup)
 2006 - rode in Qualifying Round One only
 2009 - Runner-up (11 pts)

See also 
 Denmark national speedway team (U-21)

References

External links 

 (Polish) Leon Madsen' articles at SportoweFakty.pl

1988 births
Living people
Danish speedway riders
Poole Pirates riders
People from Vejle Municipality
Sportspeople from the Region of Southern Denmark